Two elections were held in Taiwan on the same day 14 January 2012:
2012 Taiwanese presidential election
2012 Taiwanese legislative election